Conus albellus, common name  snowy cone snail, is a species of sea snail, a marine gastropod mollusk in the family Conidae, the cone snails, cone shells or cones.

Notes
Additional information regarding this species:
 Taxonomy: Conus albellus is part of a species complex including C. limpusi, C. lizardensis and C. colmani, that needs re-evaluation. For conservation implications, all are here tentatively listed as distinct.

Distribution
This marine species is endemic to Australia and occurs off Queensland.

References

 Röckel, D. & Korn, W. 1990. Zur Indentitat von Conus lizardensis Crosse, 1865 und Conus sibogae Schepman, 1913- mit Beschreibung dreier neuer Conus-Arten von Queensland, Australien (Mollusca: Conidae). Acta Conchyliorum 2: 5-23, pls 1-10 
 Wilson, B. (1994) Australian marine shells. Prosobranch gastropods. Vol. 2 Neogastropods. Odyssey Publishing, Kallaroo, Western Australia, 370 pp.
 Röckel, D., Korn, W. & Kohn, A.J. 1995. Manual of the Living Conidae. Volume 1: Indo-Pacific Region. Wiesbaden : Hemmen 517 pp
 Puillandre N., Duda T.F., Meyer C., Olivera B.M. & Bouchet P. (2015). One, four or 100 genera? A new classification of the cone snails. Journal of Molluscan Studies. 81: 1-23

External links
 To World Register of Marine Species
 

albellus
Gastropods of Australia
Gastropods described in 1990